A. William Maupin was a justice of the Supreme Court of Nevada from 1997 to 2009.

Education
Maupin received his bachelor's degree from the University of Nevada, Reno in 1968 and his Juris Doctor from the University of Arizona College of Law in 1971.

Career
After law school, Maupin worked in private practice until 1993 when Governor Bob Miller appointed him a judge for the Eighth Judicial District Court in Carson City. In 1996, he was elected to the Supreme Court.

In 2002, Maupin was re-elected to the Court, defeating former district judge Don Chairez 58.39% to 32.31%.

After retiring from the court in 2009, he joined the law firm of Lionel Sawyer & Collins.

References

 A. William Maupin at Ballotpedia

Justices of the Nevada Supreme Court
James E. Rogers College of Law alumni
Year of birth missing (living people)
University of Nevada, Reno alumni
Place of birth missing (living people)
Living people
Chief Justices of the Nevada Supreme Court